Harry Francis Benns (born 13 January 2000) is an English semi-professional footballer who plays as a midfielder for  club Stalybridge Celtic.

He turned professional at Port Vale in May 2018, making his first-team debut that same month. He joined Stafford Rangers on loan for the first half of the 2018–19 season, and ended the campaign on loan at Kidsgrove Athletic. Released by Port Vale at the end of the 2018–19 season, he then joined Hyde United for a three-year spell. He joined Stalybridge Celtic in July 2022.

Career

Port Vale
Benns came through the youth-team at Port Vale and was given a professional contract in May 2018 after being named as Youth Player of the Year for the 2017–18 season. Manager Neil Aspin gave him his debut on the final day of the 2017–18 season, a 5–0 defeat at Cambridge United on 5 May, though he entered the game as a 75th-minute substitute for Ben Whitfield when the "Valiants" were already four goals down.

On 23 August 2018, Benns joined Northern Premier League Premier Division side Stafford Rangers on an initial month-long loan deal – later extended until the end of the 2018–19 season; coach Gary Brabin said that "it is an opportunity for him now to play men's football and get to know what it is about". On 8 September, he scored his first goal in senior football, providing Rangers with the winner in a 2–1 victory at Grimsby Borough in the first round of qualification for the FA Cup. He was named as Stafford Rangers Player of the Month for September. On 20 March 2019, he joined Northern Premier League Division One West club Kidsgrove Athletic on loan until the end of the season. Vale manager John Askey confirmed that he would not be offering Benns a new contract on 16 May.

Non-League
Benns joined Northern Premier League Premier Division side Hyde United after arriving at Ewen Fields on the first day of the 2019–20 pre-season. He made 16 appearances for the "Tigers", scoring one goal, before picking up a season ending injury in December. He did not feature in the 2020–21 season, which was curtailed after ten games due to the COVID-19 pandemic in England. He featured 30 times in the 2021–22 campaign, and was an unused substitute in the final of the Manchester Premier Cup, where Hyde were beaten by Ashton United. He left the club alongside five others players after rejecting the opportunity to return for pre-season training.

On 5 July 2022, Benns joined Stalybridge Celtic, also of the Northern Premier League Premier Division.

Style of play
Speaking in May 2018, Port Vale youth-team coach Mike Ede described Benns as a creative midfielder who "is clever, has the ability to score goals and will take shots from places where you don't think" and who "can play off to the side or as a number 10".

Career statistics

Honours
Hyde United
Manchester Premier Cup runner-up: 2022

References

2000 births
Living people
People from Warrington
English footballers
Association football midfielders
Manchester City F.C. players
Port Vale F.C. players
Stafford Rangers F.C. players
Kidsgrove Athletic F.C. players
Hyde United F.C. players
Stalybridge Celtic F.C. players
English Football League players
Northern Premier League players